There are five planning regions of Latvia; Kurzeme, Latgale, Riga, Vidzeme and Zemgale. The boundaries of the regions aligns to the boundaries of the municipalities of Latvia following the municipality reform of 1 July 2009. The planning regions of Latvia are not administrative territorial divisions, since they are not mentioned in the law that prescribes the administrative territorial divisions of Latvia. They were replaced with new planning regions in 2021.

They are identical in area to the statistical regions of the country, except with different names and the city of Riga being separate from the rest of Riga Planning Region.

List

History 
Regional institutions began formation 1997 according to municipal initiatives on the planning of common development. Following legislation on regional development, the five planning regions were created according to the 5 May 2009 decision no. 391 of the Latvian Cabinet of Ministers: "Decisions on Territories of the Planning Regions.

See also 
Historical Latvian Lands
Planning regions of Latvia after 2021 reform

References

External links 
Ministry of Regional Development and Local-governments

Subdivisions of Latvia
Latvia geography-related lists
Reform in Latvia